Arenimonas caeni is a Gram-negative, rod-shaped, non-spore-forming and motile bacterium from the genus of Arenimonas which has been isolated from activated sludge from Wuhu in China.

References

Xanthomonadales
Bacteria described in 2018